Belz is a town in Ukraine but also may refer to:

 Belz (Hasidic dynasty), a Hasidic dynasty from the Ukrainian town
 Belz (crater), a crater on Mars, named after the Ukrainian town
 Belz, Morbihan, Brittany, France
 Belz Enterprises, an American company
 Belz Great Synagogue
 Belz Museum of Asian and Judaic Art
 "The Belz", nickname of comedian Richard Belzer
 Duchy of Belz
 Gabrielle Belz, Australian molecular immunologist
 Joel Belz
 Christian Belz
 German spelling of Bălți, Moldavia, which can also be spelled Belts